Benedict Zuckermann (9 October 1818 – 17 December 1891) was a Jewish scientist in Breslau.

Life 

Zuckermann was born in Breslau (Wrocław), in the Kingdom of Prussia's Province of Silesia, an Ashkenazic Jew. He received a thorough Hebrew and secular education at the institutions of his native city, and devoted himself at the university to the study of mathematics and astronomy. In 1845 he joined Heinrich Graetz in agitating for an address to Zecharias Frankel to congratulate him on the conservative stand which he had taken against the Frankfurt Conference; and when Frankel assumed the management of the Breslau seminary he appointed Zuckermann on the teaching staff. He gave instruction in mathematics to those of the students who had not had a regular school training, and taught calendric science in the academic department, at the same time acting as librarian and administrator of the stipendiary fund.

Zuckermann's religious attitude was strictly Orthodox. Twice a day he attended the synagogue maintained by him in the house which he had inherited from his father, although he lived in the seminary building, where daily services were held in the chapel. He never married; and while genial and kindly in nature, he was strongly opposed to anything savoring of ostentation. On his 70th birthday he fled from Breslau to escape all ovations, and in his will he forbade the delivering of a funeral address. He died in Breslau.

Writings 
 "Über Sabbathjahrcyclus und Jubelperiode," Breslau, 1859 (translated into English by A. Loewy, London, 1866);
 "Über Talmudische Münzen und Gewichte," Breslau, 1862;
 "Katalog der Seminarbibliothek," part i., ib. 1870 (2d ed., ib. 1876);
 "Das Mathematische im Talmud," ib. 1878;
 "Tabelle zur Berechnung des Eintrittes der Nacht," ib. 1892;
 "Anleitung und Tabellen zur Vergleichung Jüdischer und Christlicher Zeitangaben," ib. 1893.
 He also contributed occasionally to the "Monatsschrift für Geschichte und Wissenschaft des Judenthums".

References 

People from the Province of Silesia
19th-century German astronomers
19th-century German mathematicians
19th-century German Jews
Scientists from Wrocław
1818 births
1891 deaths
Academic staff of the University of Breslau